The Ministry of National Defense is the cabinet-level administrative office in charge of "maintaining the independence and sovereignty" of Chile. It is also charged with planning, directing, coordinating, executing, controlling and informing the defense policies formulated by the President of Chile. The minister supervises all the Chilean armed forces. It is Chile's ministry of defence.

History 
During the first days of the independence movements, the senior "secretary" of the respective Junta would function as the Secretary of Government with administrative power over the army. The office officially first came to be on 17 March 1814, when then Supreme Director Francisco de la Lastra dictated the Constitutional Norms approved on that date. It was then named Secretariat of War. It was abolished the same year by the Spanish authorities when, after the Battle of Rancagua, they re-asserted royal power.

On 23 October 1818, after independence the secretariat was re-established, but this time with the inclusion of the Department of Navy as a "Secretariat of War and Navy" (1818–1837), though in common usage, the secretaries started to be called ministers when they held both secretariats (War and Navy) concurrently. Later on 1 February 1837 the office was officially renamed "Ministry of War and Navy" (1837–1932). In 1924, War and Navy were separated into two independent ministries, but on 8 July 1932 both branches were reunited again into one ministry renamed "Ministry of Defense", with the addition of the department of Aviation that had belonged to the Ministry of the Interior until that date.

On 28 October 1947, by Decree 2.320, it fell under the purview of this ministry the control of the Supreme Command of National Defense, the General Staff of the Armed Forces, the Central Purchasing Committee of the Armed Forces, the Civil Defense Forces and the Chilean chapter of the Red Cross. In 1960, the oversight was expanded to include the Superior Council on National Security (Consusena) and the Council of Commanders-in-Chief. According to Decree 200 of 15 April 1976, the oversight was again expanded to include the National Police (Carabineros and Investigaciones).

As indicated before, this ministry has undergone several reorganizations during its long history, reflected in its different names:

 Secretariat of War (1814)
 Secretariat of War and Navy (1818–1831)
 Ministry of War and Navy (1831–1924)
 Ministry of War and Ministry of Navy (1924–1932)
 Ministry of National Defense – First Creation (1932)
 Ministry of War and Aviation and Ministry of Navy (1932)
 Ministry of National Defense – Second Creation (1932–present)

Organization 
The main dependencies of the Ministry are:
 Undersecretary of Defense: in charge of the defence policy
 National Academy of Political and Strategic Studies (ANEPE)
 Undersecretary of the Armed Forces in charge of the administratives duties
 Joint Staff Command

Titulars

Patria Vieja period

Ministers of War and Navy

Ministers of War

Ministers of Navy

Ministers of National Defense (First Creation)

Ministers of War and Aviation

Ministers of Navy

Ministers of National Defense (Second Creation, 1932–1990)

Ministers of National Defense (1990–present)

See also 
 Military of Chile
 Defence Diplomacy

References

External links
 Official Website of the Ministry of Defense of Chile 

Chile
National Defense
Military of Chile
Chile, National Defense